Leases Corner is an unincorporated community in Cass County, Indiana, in the United States.

History
Leases Corner once contained a post office called Fitch. The Fitch post office was established in 1851, and was discontinued in 1863.

References

Unincorporated communities in Cass County, Indiana
Unincorporated communities in Indiana